The 1906 Oklahoma Sooners football team represented the University of Oklahoma as an independent during the 1906 college football season. In their second year under head coach Bennie Owen, the Sooners compiled a 5–2–2 record, and outscored their opponents by a combined total of 124 to 36.

Schedule

References

Oklahoma
Oklahoma Sooners football seasons
Oklahoma Sooners football